"19th Nervous Breakdown" is a song recorded by the English rock band the Rolling Stones. Written by Mick Jagger and Keith Richards, it was recorded in late 1965 and released as a single in February 1966. It reached number 2 on both the US Billboard Hot 100 and Britain's Record Retailer chart (subsequently the UK Singles Chart), while topping the charts compiled by Cash Box and NME. In the UK, it broke the band's streak of consecutive number-one singles that had started with "It's All Over Now" (1964).

Composition and recording
The song was written during the group's October–December 1965 tour of the United States and recorded at the conclusion of their fourth North American tour during the Aftermath album sessions, between 3 and 8 December 1965 at RCA Recording Studios in Hollywood, California.

Jagger came up with the title first and then wrote the lyrics around it. The opening guitar figure is played by Keith Richards while in the verses Brian Jones plays a bass-note figure that derives from "Diddley Daddy" by Bo Diddley, a major influence on the Rolling Stones' style. Here the riff is extended into a long blues chord progression behind verbose lyrics similar to those of their previous UK single, "Get Off of My Cloud", and the verse alternates with a bridge theme. The track is also known for Bill Wyman's so-called "dive-bombing" bass line at the end. At almost four minutes' duration, it is long by the standards of the time.

Cash Box described the single as a "pulsating, hard-driving fast-moving bluesy affair about a sensitive gal who lets her guy get him down."

Personnel

According to authors Philippe Margotin and Jean-Michel Guesdon, except where noted:

The Rolling Stones
Mick Jagger vocals
Keith Richards backing vocals, lead guitar, fuzz guitar
Brian Jones guitar
Bill Wyman bass
Charlie Watts drums

Additional musician
Ian Stewart piano

Release
"19th Nervous Breakdown" was released as a single on 4 February 1966 in the UK and on 12 February 1966 in the US. Like many early Rolling Stones recordings, "19th Nervous Breakdown" has been officially released only in mono sound. A rather weak stereo mix (as well as being about 20 seconds shorter) of the song has turned up in private and bootleg collections. One version of the stereo mix features a radically different vocal from Jagger, who alternates between mellow on the verses and rawer on the chorus. The Stones performed "19th Nervous Breakdown" live on The Ed Sullivan Show on 11 September.

"19th Nervous Breakdown" has further appeared on numerous Stones compilations, including Hot Rocks 1964–1971 (1971), Singles Collection: The London Years (1989), Forty Licks (2002), and GRRR! (2012).

In 2016, a previously unreleased alternate mono mix of the track appeared on Stray Cats, a compilation of singles and non-album tracks, in the box set The Rolling Stones in Mono.

Commercial performance 
In the UK, "19th Nervous Breakdown" reached number 2 on the Record Retailer chart. The single topped the NME Top 30 chart for three weeks in addition to the BBC's Pick of the Pops charts. The single was the fifth best-selling single of 1966 in the UK, achieving greater full-year sales than both Nancy Sinatra's "These Boots Are Made for Walkin' and the Stones' own "Paint It Black".

In the US, "19th Nervous Breakdown" peaked at number 2 on the Billboard Hot 100 for three weeks, behind "The Ballad of the Green Berets" by SSgt Barry Sadler and number 1 on the Cash Box Top 100.

Chart performance

References

Sources

 
 

The Rolling Stones songs
1966 singles
Decca Records singles
London Records singles
Cashbox number-one singles
Number-one singles in Germany
Songs written by Jagger–Richards
Song recordings produced by Andrew Loog Oldham
1966 songs